Everling is a surname. Notable people with the surname include:

Gerald Everling (born  1943), American football player and coach and collegiate wrestler and coach
Norbert Müller-Everling (born 1953), German artist
Ulrich Everling (1925–2018), German jurist